Ulocuplumab (INN; development code MDX-1338) is a monoclonal antibody designed for the treatment of hematologic malignancies.

This drug was developed by Bristol-Myers Squibb.

References 

Monoclonal antibodies